Zlot is a town in the municipality of Bor, Serbia. According to the 2002 census, the town has a population of 3,757 people. 1890 the population was slightly higher at 3,850 inhabitants. About half of the Zlotians are Vlachs.

References

Bor, Serbia
Populated places in Bor District
Romanian communities in Serbia